Events from the year 1534 in India.

Events
 Ismail Adil Shah reign (since 1510) as king of the Bijapur Sultanate ends with his death.
 Mallu Adil Shah reigns briefly as king of the Bijapur Sultanate before he dies.
 Ibrahim Adil Shah I becomes king of the Bijapur Sultanate (reigns until 1558).

Births
 September 24, Guru Ram Das, the fourth of the ten gurus of Sikhism is born (dies 1581)

Deaths
 27 August – Ismail Adil Shah, king of the Bijapur Sultanate (born 1498)
 Mallu Adil Shah, king of the Bijapur Sultanate
 Sri Chaitanya Mahaprabhu (born 1486)

See also
 Timeline of Indian history

References 

 
India